DXRX (93.1 FM) is a radio station owned and operated by Audiovisual Communicators, serving as a relay station of Monster RX 93.1 in Manila. Its transmitter is located in Zamboanga City.

Profile
The station is launched in 1996 as Audiovisual Communicators' first provincial station. Branded as Dream Radio RX 93.1, it was the first station in Zamboanga City to carry a Top 40 format. Its office was located at the 3rd Floor, Gold Fountain Centrum along Mayor Jaldon St. It aired daily from 6:00 am to 12:00 am. It went off the air in January 2007, as its studios and transmitter were already vacated due to rental issues, contract expiration, and poor maintenance inside the building. Since then, ACI has put the station on sale.

In August 2013, Brigada Mass Media Corporation, owner of Brigada Newspaper & its flagship station in General Santos, acquired the station and rebranded it to 93.1 Brigada News FM. It became the first station in Zamboanga to carry a news and music format. It went on air after the crisis in September 2013 and became the No.1 most-listened FM news and music station in the city.

By the middle of 2015, Brigada News FM transferred to 89.9 FM, which was owned Baycomms Broadcasting Corporation prior to BMMC's acquisition in 2013. Since then, this frequency was inactive until late 2017, when the station was revived as a relay of RX 93.1 in Manila.

References

External links
Monster RX 93.1 FB Page
Monster RX 93.1 Website

Radio stations in Zamboanga City
Contemporary hit radio stations in the Philippines
Radio stations established in 1996